Illumination Studios Paris (formerly known as Illumination Mac Guff) is a French animated feature production company owned by Illumination, a division of Universal Pictures. Based in Paris, France, the company was created in 2011 as part of Universal's purchase deal of the animation arm of French animation and VFX company Mac Guff. It is responsible for the animation on Illumination's feature-length animated films and associated short films, most notably the Despicable Me franchise.

History

Mac Guff era (2011–2021)

Following their work with Illumination on Despicable Me (2010) and its associated short films, Universal purchased the animation arm of Mac Guff, aptly renaming it Illumination Mac Guff. The first film produced by the new studio was The Lorax (2012). All subsequent films by Illumination have had most of their animation work outsourced to the studio, as it benefits from French subsidies.

Studios Paris era (2021–present)
With the release of Sing 2 in December 2021, the studio was renamed to Illumination Studios Paris.

Filmography

Feature films

Released

Upcoming

Short films

Television specials

Miscellaneous work
88th Academy Awards (2016) – Provided the animation for Kevin, Stuart and Bob presenting the award for Best Animated Short Film.

References

External links

French animation studios
Illumination (company)
Universal Pictures subsidiaries